The Alfa Romeo Portello Plant in Portello Milan, Italy was the first Alfa Romeo factory, and the main factory between 1908 and the 1960s. The factory was closed in 1986 following FIAT's buyout of Alfa Romeo, but all major production had already been transferred 20 years earlier to the Alfa Romeo Arese Plant. The history of the factory is primarily involved in automobile manufacture, but over the years other products were manufactured as well.

History
The first industrial plant was founded by the French company Darracq, which had decided to open a branch in Italy. The site chosen for that purpose was directly adjacent to areas that had hosted the 1906 International fair in Milan. The location was on Via Gattamelata in Milan, on the way to Gallarate, in the then extreme north-western outskirts of the city.

The same area was chosen by other car companies to establish their headquarters or branches,  first Isotta Fraschini, then Citroën, FIAT, Carrozzeria Touring, Zagato and  the Cesare Sala Bodyworks. The latter was essentially forced to choose that area because their activities were closely linked to those of Alfa.

In 1997 Gabriele Salvatores shot his 1997 film Nirvana (film) in the Plant. The factory buildings were subsequently demolished to make room to a green area. The city park inaugurated in 2011 as Parco del Portello. (Or Parco Industria Alfa Romeo)

List of cars produced

References

Fiat Group factories
Alfa Romeo
Former motor vehicle assembly plants
Motor vehicle assembly plants in Italy